The 1987 Head Cup, also known as the 1987 Austrian Open Kitzbühel, was a men's tennis tournament played on outdoor clay courts that was part of the 1987 Nabisco Grand Prix. It was the 17th edition of the tournament and took place at the Tennis stadium Kitzbühel in Kitzbühel, Austria, from 3 August until 9 August 1987. Second-seeded Emilio Sánchez won the singles title.

Finals

Singles
 Emilio Sánchez defeated  Miloslav Mečíř, 6–4, 6–1, 4–6, 6–1
 It was Sánchez' 3rd singles title of the year and the 6th of his career.

Doubles
 Sergio Casal /  Emilio Sánchez defeated  Miloslav Mečíř /  Tomáš Šmíd, 7–6, 7–6

References

External links
 ITF tournament edition details

Austrian Open
Austrian Open Kitzbühel
Austrian Open